The 2001 Kodori crisis was a confrontation in the Kodori Valley, Abkhazia, in October 2001 between Georgians (who were supported by ethnic Chechen fighters) and Abkhazian forces. The crisis was largely neglected by the world media, which was focused on the concurrent US attack on Afghanistan. The fighting resulted in the deaths of at least 40 people.

Timeline
On October 4, 2001, a group of Chechen and Georgian fighters led by the commander Ruslan Gelayev entered the gorge from the Georgian side and attacked the village Giorgievskoe. Then, on October 8, 2001, a helicopter carrying United Nations observers was shot down over Kodori, killing nine.

Aftermath
On 5 August 2004, Valery Chkhetiani, one of the Georgian fighters captured by Abkhazian forces, suffered a stroke during a walk and was brought to a hospital, where he died two days later, on 7 August. Chkhetiani, a resident of Kutaisi and born in 1973, had been condemned to a prison sentence of 15 years.

On 29 July 2006, Mart Laar, former prime minister of Estonia and then adviser to the Georgian president, was quoted as saying that the Kodori conflict was engineered by Russia. Laar also warned that future provocations of Georgia by Russia are to be expected, but that Georgia has prepared itself to make it through any challenges posed by Russia.

On 30 April 2008, Russia accused Georgia of massing 1500 troops in the Kodori region in preparation to invade Abkhazia. Georgia maintained the troops were present in accordance with a 1994 accord that allowed for peacekeeping forces in the region and were essential to maintaining order after the 2001 Kodori crisis. Russia responded by deploying troops to the region, further escalating tensions between Russia and Georgia. These forces would later take part in the war in 2008.

References

2001 in Abkhazia
Kodori crisis
2001 in Georgia (country)
Conflicts in 2001
Abkhaz–Georgian conflict
October 2001 events in Asia
Second Chechen War